An opera cloak is an ankle- or floor-length loose-fitting cloak of dark, luxurious fabric such as velvet, brocade or satin, to be worn over an evening gown for a woman or a man's white tie or black tie tuxedo, named after its typical designation for the opera. It may be described as a fitted cloak (sometimes with sleeves), generally not as tailored as a coat. For white tie, men's opera cloaks are frequently worn with a walking stick and top hat.

Like cloaks and capes, the opera coat is usually lined in a coloured expensive fabric, such as silk, or a weave like satin, for a more opulent look. An opera coat often has an elegant or dramatic collar, and may have padded sleeves. It may or may not be trimmed in fur. It often has an elaborate braided rope instead of buttons at the neck.

See also
opera
opera hat
opera gloves
opera glasses

Formal wear
Coats (clothing)
History of clothing (Western fashion)